Gustaf Bergström (8 March 1889 – 12 October 1954) was a Swedish sports shooter. He competed in the 50 m pistol event at the 1936 Summer Olympics.

References

1889 births
1954 deaths
Swedish male sport shooters
Olympic shooters of Sweden
Shooters at the 1936 Summer Olympics
Sport shooters from Stockholm